Iga Ueno NINJA Festa (Jap. 伊賀上野 NINJA フェスタ) is the annual five-week ninja-themed festival in the Japanese city of Iga (in the former province of Iga), from April 1 to May 6. Tens of thousands of ninja fans travel to Iga for ninja-inspired performances, competitions, and opportunities to practice ninja skills, organized to promote the city. During the family-friendly festival, passengers on Iga train lines dressed in ninja costumes are given free rides. Since 2001, the mayor of Iga and the city council also hold an annual session while dressed up as ninja, called the Ninja Congress (忍者議会).

See also
Iga-ryū
Iga-ryū Ninja Museum

References

External links
 Official website of the 2007 edition
(The Daily Telegraph) Japanese ninja festival (gallery)

Annual fairs
Festivals in Japan
Spring festivals
Festivals in Mie Prefecture
Iga, Mie